Elections to the 49th Parliament of New South Wales were held on Saturday 19 March 1988. All seats in the Legislative Assembly and a third of the seats in the Legislative Council were up for election. The Labor government of Premier Barrie Unsworth was defeated by the Liberal-National Coalition, led by Opposition Leader Nick Greiner.

The election took place following a redistribution of seats, which resulted in the Assembly growing from 99 to 109 seats.

Issues 
The Labor Party, under Neville Wran and, since 1986, Barrie Unsworth, had been in office for 12 years.  A number of corruption scandals had tarnished Labor's image. Among these was the jailing of Labor's Minister for Corrective Services Rex Jackson in 1987 for accepting bribes for the early release of prisoners.

Even before then, two by-elections in 1986 indicated that NSW voters were about to call time on the three-term Labor government.  When Unsworth, then a member of the New South Wales Legislative Council, ran for the previously safe Labor Assembly seat of Rockdale in 1986, he only won it by 54 votes after losing more than 17 percent of Labor's primary vote from 1981. Additionally, Labor suffered a 22-percent primary vote swing in Wran's old seat of Bass Hill, allowing the Liberals to take it on a 103-vote margin. However, by-elections in Heathcote and Bankstown in 1987 saw only small swings against the government.

The Liberals' campaign slogan was "A change for the better". Greiner campaigned on a promise to clean up state government, foreshadowing the establishment of the Independent Commission Against Corruption, as well as promising to freeze government expenditure, create 16,000 new employment and training positions, and pay more attention to law enforcement.

In rural electorates, Labor's positions on gun laws and conservation alienated many voters. Health care was also a campaign issue.

Future Liberal Prime Minister Tony Abbott admitted in 2005 that he voted Labor at this election saying that Unsworth "was the best deal premier that New South Wales had ever had" and knew that it would not damage Greiner's prospects at this election.

Key dates

Results

Legislative Assembly 

The result was a landslide for the Coalition parties. Election analyst Antony Green later noted that "the 1988 result was startling, the worst Labor performance, and best Coalition result, since the Lang era of the 1930s". Labor lost heartland seats including Balmain, Newcastle and Swansea for the first time since the turn of the century.

Seven non-aligned Independents were elected to the Legislative Assembly.
{{Australian elections/Title row
| table style = float:right;clear:right;margin-left:1em;
| title        = New South Wales state election, 19 March 1988
| house        = Legislative Assembly
| series       = New South Wales state election
| back         = 1984
| forward      = 1991
| enrolled     = 3,541,447
| total_votes  = 3,314,229
| turnout %    = 93.58%
| turnout chg  = +1.07%
| informal     = 63,870
| informal %   = 3.07%
| informal chg = +0.84%
}}

|}

{{bar box|float=right|title=Popular vote|titlebar=#ddd|width=600px|barwidth=410px|bars=

}}

Legislative Council 

{{Australian elections/Title row
| table style = float:right;clear:right;margin-left:1em;
| title        = New South Wales state election, 19 March 1988.
| house        = Legislative Council
| series       = New South Wales state election
| back         = 1984
| forward      = 1991
| staggered    = yes
| enrolled     = 3,541,447
| total_votes  = 3,307,855
| turnout %    = 91.92
| turnout chg  = –0.60
| informal     = 267,113
| informal %   = 8.01
| informal chg = +1.42
}}

	

|}

Seats changing hands

Members listed in italics did not recontest their seats.
Ballina was a new seat created from much of the area of the old district of Lismore, which was held by Independent member Bruce Duncan, who retired from politics at this election.
The sitting Labor member for Gosford, Brian McGowan instead contested the new seat of The Entrance and lost.
The sitting Labor member for Heathcote, Ian McManus instead contested the new seat of Burragorang and won.
In addition, the National party held the seat of Northern Tablelands, which it had won from Labor in the 1987 by-election.
¶ Bass Hill was won by the Liberal party in the 1986 by-election. It was regained by Labor in this election.

Redistribution affected seats

Post-election pendulum

See also
Candidates of the 1988 New South Wales state election

References 

Elections in New South Wales
1988 elections in Australia
1980s in New South Wales
March 1988 events in Australia